Krzysztof Abrahamowicz (1852–1916) was a Polish politician.

References

1852 births
1916 deaths
Polish politicians